Enrique DaSilva, better known by his stage name Breez Evahflowin, is a rapper based in New York. He is a founding member of the Stronghold rap collective. He was crowned the national grand champion of the Blaze Battle competition in 1999 sponsored by HBO and was 5 week battle champion on Yo! MTV Raps.

He released his own independent solo 12-inch single, "Forsaken", in 1996, which appeared on the Barely Breaking Even compilation album Hip-Hop Forever (1998) by DJ/producer Kenny Dope. He recorded singles for an assortment of different indie labels, including the Boston-based Detonator Records, as well as contributing a slew of guest appearances on records and tours. During his tenure, he has worked with several underground rap artists including Vast Aire, Immortal Technique, Slug, Chali 2na, and Molemen.

Discography
Albums
 Fly (2006)
 Troublemakers (2008) 
 Breez Deez Treez (2009)
 As He Goes On... (2010)

EPs
 Pro-Files: The EP (2000)
 The Mic and the Music  (2004) 

Singles
 "Forsaken" (1996)
 "I Heard It" (1997)
 "Refined" (1999)
 "Between Dah Seams" (2001)
 "Don't Stop" (2001)
 "Gimmie Mine" (2001)
 "Grown Men" (2002) 
 "Give It Away" (2003)
 "When You Fall" (2009)

Guest appearances
 Akrobatik - "Ruff Enuff (Re-Mix)" from The EP (2000)
 Molemen - "Challenge Me" from Ritual of The... (2001)
 DJ JS-1 & Dub-L - "Dr_gs in My Vein" from Ground Original (2002)
 Brycon & Equal - "Samurai Code" from World's Deadliest Assassin Part II (2004)
 DJ JS-1 - "Flying Guillotines" from Audio Technician (2004)
 Zion I - "Communification" from Politicks: Collabs & B-Sides (2004)
 Vast Aire - "Posse Slash" from Look Mom... No Hands (2004)
 Rob Swift - "Dream" from Wargames (2005)
 C-Rayz Walz - "The Branding Iron" from The Dropping (2006)
 Snowgoons - "No Man's Land" from German Lugers (2007)
 Zimbabwe Legit - "Take Back the Mic" and "Take Back the Mic (KHZ Remix)" from House of Stone (2007)
 Expertiz - "Ring of Fire" from Disrupting Nature's Balance (2010)
 Rob Swift - "Principio" and "Ultimo" from The Architect (2010)
 Infinito 2017 - "Eyewitness to Dopeness" from We Are Dark (2010)
 Dumi Right - "What They Want (Remix)" and "What They Want (Burn Rubber Remix)" from Connect the Dots (2012)
 Atari Blitzkrieg - "Death from Above" from Technicolor Crime Scenes (2013)

References

External links

 
 
 

American male rappers
Living people
Rappers from Brooklyn
Underground rappers
21st-century American rappers
21st-century American male musicians
1975 births